Max Brüel  (14 July 1927 - 31 March 1995) was a Danish architect and jazz musician, an accomplished pianist and saxophonist.

He is the designer of Denmark's tallest building, the Herlev Hospital in Copenhagen.

See also
List of Danish architects

References

1927 births
1995 deaths
Danish jazz musicians
Recipients of the Eckersberg Medal
20th-century Danish architects